Override may refer to:

 Dr. Gregory Herd, a Marvel Comics character formerly named Override
 Manual override, a function where an automated system is placed under manual control
 Method overriding, a subclassing feature in Object Oriented programming languages.
 Price override, in retail
 Override, a character on the anime television series Transformers: Cybertron
 Override (film), a 1994 science fiction short film
 Override, a 2021 British science fiction thriller film
 OverRide (video game)
 Overrider, a Marvel Comics mutant
 Overriders, an insurance term
 Overriding (mathematics)
 Overriding aorta, a medical condition in which aorta emerge from abnormal position.
 Veto override, a procedure employed by legislatures